Sberbank is a Russian banking and financial services company.

Sberbank may also refer to:

 SB Sberbank of Russia JSC, Kazakhstani subsidiary of the Russian company
 Sberbank CIB, former Troika Dialog, now owned by Sberbank
 Sberbank City, a building complex in Moscow, Russia
 Sberbank Europe Group, a former Austria-headquartered subsidiary of the Russian company
 Sberbank Srbija, Serbian subsidiary of the Russian company

See also